The White Tie Affair (also known as TWTA) is an American pop band from Chicago, Illinois, consisting of vocalist Chris Wallace, guitarist Sean-P, drummer Tim McLaughlin and keyboardist Ryan McLain. In early 2007, the band signed with Epic Records/Slightly Dangerous and released their debut album, Walk This Way, in April 2008. The album contains the band's two singles, "Allow Me to Introduce Myself...Mr. Right" and "Candle (Sick and Tired)", which have been featured on MTV's TRL and The Hills

History

The band signed with Epic/Slightly Dangerous in 2007 and began touring with artists such as Secondhand Serenade, Making April, Innerpartysystem, Metro Station, The Medic Droid, and Kill Hannah. In June and July 2007, the band went on a cross-country US tour alongside Fireworks. In the fall of 2007, the band recorded their debut album, Walk This Way, at Annetenna Studios in Burbank, California. In January 2008, bass player Jeremy Johnson left the band and was replaced by Ryan Cook, who later also left the band in February 2009.
 
In March 2008, the band was invited to perform at the annual "Pajama Party" at the Playboy Mansion. That summer, TWTA joined the 2nd Annual True Colors Tour for the show's Midwestern leg, sharing the stage with Cyndi Lauper, The B-52's and Rosie O'Donnell. TWTA also headlined several dates of Kill Hannah's Hope for the Hopeless tour during this time, along with The Medic Droid. That fall, the band was part of Playboys Girls of the Big 10 Tour and was featured in a fashion spread in the magazine's November issue. TWTA was also featured on the episode six of the fourth season of MTV's The Hills. In December 2008, the band's remix of "All Black" was included in Good Charlotte's Greatest Remixes release.

In March 2009, the White Tie Affair toured with Secondhand Serenade and served as the opening act for Lady Gaga on her first solo North American tour, The Fame Ball Tour. Following The Fame Ball tour, the band would take part in Van's 2009 Warped Tour. The White Tie Affair would join bands such as Thrice, NOFX, 3OH!3, All Time Low, Cash Cash, and Alexisonfire at the summer-long music festival.

In October 2009, The White Tie Affair began their headlining tour along with Every Avenue, Stereo Skyline and Runner Runner.

In 2010, shortly after their headlining tour—The Traveling Talent Show—drummer Tim McLaughlin left the band. There was never any permanent replacement for the band's drummer. The band later recorded their second album, which remains unreleased despite being set to release in the fall of 2010. On April 13, 2010 the single "You Look Better When I'm Drunk" was released.

In an online interview which took place June 8, 2012, it was revealed that the White Tie Affair had broken up.

In August 2012, vocalist Chris Wallace posted on Facebook that he would release his debut solo album, Push Rewind, in September 2012.

In October 2020, the band began releasing cryptic photos on their social media accounts, eventually announcing the news of their reunion that same month.

Commercial debut
On April 22, 2008, the White Tie Affair released its major label debut, Walk This Way. The album contains the singles "" and "Candle (Sick and Tired)". Produced by Matt Mahaffey and Jeff Turzo of Wired All Wrong, the album was recorded at Annetenna Studios in Burbank, CA. in the fall of 2007. The music videos for "Allow Me to Introduce Myself...Mr. Right" and "Candle (Sick and Tired)" debuted on No Good TV in the spring of 2008 and were also featured on MTV's TRL. The uncut director's version of the two videos reached 400,000 views on YouTube, and was the most watched YouTube video on March 29, 2008. In December 2008, director Jon Watts filmed a new video for "Candle (Sick and Tired)" which featured Jessica Lee Rose, as well as cameos by Joel and Benji Madden of Good Charlotte in the tour bus scene. Watts had previously filmed videos for numerous bands such as Death Cab for Cutie and the artist Fatboy Slim.

Live show/style
The band has been critically acclaimed for their dynamic live shows. Many of TWTA's songs are dance songs that thrive off of audience interaction. An article from the Chicago Sun-Times describes the sound:
There’s a chance the White Tie Affair is on the cutting edge by adopting that “has a beat and can be danced to” mentality. “In my opinion, it seems like music is leaning toward that,” Wallace says. “Hellogoodbye and Justin Timberlake kind of let us know that it was OK to do that. That took the pressure off and paved the way for us to do what we love without falling in line with a scene. The White Tie Affair sounds like a fusion of Timberlake and AFI working together to create pop for the PlayStation generation. 
– Kyle Koster, Staff Reporter, Chicago Sun-Times. 

In an October 31, 2008 New York Times review, music critic Jon Pareles wrote that The White Tie Affair's style was "leaning toward new-wave guitar and mixing apologies with come-ons."

In early 2009, "The Price of Company" was used in advertisements for the movie Miss March. That March, they were featured in the Verizon Wireless's Rhapsody commercial with their song "Candle (Sick and Tired)". In April 2009, the band was also featured in Soundcheck Riders.

Discography

Albums

EP

Singles

References

Rock music groups from Illinois
American pop rock music groups
Dance-rock musical groups
Musical groups from Chicago